Mich'i Mich'ini (Aymara mich'i bow, the reduplication indicates that there is a group or a complex of something, -ni a suffix to indicate ownership, "the one with many bows", also spelled Michimichini) is a  mountain in the Andes of Peru. It is situated in the Puno Region, Lampa Province, Ocuviri District.

References

Mountains of Puno Region
Mountains of Peru